Jaime Vasquez Ramírez (born 21 February 1991 in Lima, Peru) is a Peruvian footballer who most recently played for Unión Huaral. He plays as a right-back.

Club career
Vásquez came from Sporting Cristal's youth divisions. He was promoted to the first team in 2009.

References

External links

1991 births
Living people
Footballers from Lima
Association football fullbacks
Peruvian footballers
Peru international footballers
Sporting Cristal footballers
Unión Comercio footballers
Universidad Técnica de Cajamarca footballers
Unión Huaral footballers
Sport Loreto players
Peruvian Primera División players
Peruvian Segunda División players